Guyuria are traditional Chamorro cookies. They are also known as Chamorro jawbreaker cookies due to their historically rock-hard texture. Guyuria was originally made with flour, coconut milk, and a sugar glaze. The dough is first made as one solid mass. Small pieces of dough are pinched off. Each piece is rolled out on a wooden guyuria board or on the back of a fork. Once enough cookies are formed, a batch is fried, cooled, and finally coated with a sugar glaze. The glaze is then allowed to dry on the cookies.

Some recipes include butter in the dough mixture. This results in a slightly softer cookie. Other guyuria dough recipes include sugar, baking powder, and eggs. Guyuria recipes with baking powder and eggs, however, lead to cookies that are too inflated and soft.

References
Topping, D., Ogo, P., Dungca, B (1969).  Chamorro English Dictionary.
Lepblon Fina'tinas Para Guam (Guam cookbook)(1977).  Inetnon Famalaon.
Lepblon Fina'tinas Para Guam (Guam cookbook)(Revised Edition 1988).  Inetnon Famalaon.
Quinene, P (2006).  A Taste of Guam.

Chamorro cuisine
Guamanian desserts
Cookies